Solomon Islands is divided into nine provinces. The national capital, Honiara, on the island of Guadalcanal, is separately governed as the country's Capital Territory.

History
Under the British Solomon Islands Protectorate, there were initially 12 administrative districts: Choiseul, Eastern Solomons, Gizo, Guadalcanal, Lord Howe, Malaita, Nggela and Savo, Rennell and Bellona Islands, Santa Cruz, Shortlands, Sikaiana (Stewart), and Ysabel and Cape Marsh. The administrative centre was in Tulagi.

After World War II, the protectorate was reorganised into four districts, namely Central, Western, Eastern, and Malaita, which were then further subdivided into councils. The administrative centre was moved from Tulagi to Honiara.

At its independence in 1978, the protectorate became the sovereign state of Solomon Islands. Honiara continued to function as the capital of the sovereign nation, and the inherited districts and councils remained until 1981, when the nation was reorganised into seven provinces by splitting some of the districts into provinces: the Central District was split into Central, Guadalcanal, and Isabel provinces, while the Eastern District was split into Makira-Ulawa and Temotu provinces. The other two districts, Western and Malaita, were also designated as provinces. These new provinces corresponded to the councils of the districts before 1981.

In 1983, the 22 square-kilometer Honiara was split from Guadalcanal Province and became a separately-governed capital territory. The city remains as the capital of Guadalcanal Province.

In 1995, Choiseul Province was split from Western Province, and Rennell and Bellona Province was split from Central Province, resulting in the nine provinces of today.

Population
The population census data is from the 1999, 2009 and 2019 Censuses, as provided by the Solomon Islands National Statistics Office. They show that the population has increased in the past decade for most of the provinces, especially the more urban ones, as urbanisation increases.

The figures for Guadalcanal Province do not include the separately-administered Capital Territory of Honiara; if included, that province would have had a total population of 109,382 in 1999, when it was the second largest province by population; by 2009, the combined census total for Guadalcanal and the Capital Territory would be 179,166, which would have made it the most populous province; by 2019 the combined total would be 284,326.

Provinces

[1] excluding the Capital Territory of Honiara

See also
 ISO 3166-2:SB

References

External links 
 Solomon Islands National Statistic Office – Population

 
Subdivisions of the Solomon Islands
Solomon Islands, Provinces
Solomon Islands 1
Provinces, Solomon Islands
Solomon Islands geography-related lists